Gary Lee Miller (March 19, 1947 – February 16, 1969) was a United States Army officer and a recipient of the United States military's highest decoration—the Medal of Honor—for his actions in the Vietnam War.

Biography
Miller joined the Army from Roanoke, Virginia in 1967, and by February 16, 1969 was serving as a first lieutenant in Company A, 1st Battalion, 28th Infantry Regiment, 1st Infantry Division. On that day, in Bình Dương Province, South Vietnam during Operation Toan Thang II, Miller smothered the blast of an enemy-thrown grenade with his body, sacrificing his life to protect those around him. Miller had attended a branch of Virginia Tech and was honored by the university in 2020.

Miller, aged 21 at his death, was buried in Allegheny Memorial Park in his birth city of Covington, Virginia.

Medal of Honor citation
First Lieutenant Miller's official Medal of Honor citation reads:

For conspicuous intrepidity and gallantry in action at the risk of his life above and beyond the call of duty. First Lt. Miller, Infantry, Company A, was serving as a platoon leader at night when his company ambushed a hostile force infiltrating from Cambodian sanctuaries. After contact with the enemy was broken, 1st Lt. Miller led a reconnaissance patrol from their prepared positions through the early evening darkness and dense tropical growth to search the area for enemy casualties. As the group advanced they were suddenly attacked. First Lt. Miller was seriously wounded. However, the group fought back with telling effect on the hostile force. An enemy grenade was thrown into the midst of the friendly patrol group and all took cover except 1st Lt. Miller. who in the dim light located the grenade and threw himself on it, absorbing the force of the explosion with his body. His action saved nearby members of his patrol from almost certain serious injury. The extraordinary courage and selflessness displayed by this officer were an inspiration to his comrades and are in the highest traditions of the U.S. Army.

See also

List of Medal of Honor recipients
List of Medal of Honor recipients for the Vietnam War

References

1947 births
1969 deaths
American military personnel killed in the Vietnam War
United States Army Medal of Honor recipients
United States Army officers
People from Covington, Virginia
Vietnam War recipients of the Medal of Honor
Deaths by hand grenade
United States Army personnel of the Vietnam War
Virginia Tech alumni